Edward Loughlin Mabry (1897–1989), was an American writer, poet, and chemical tycoon.

Chemical tycoon

During World War I Edward Mabry joined the Vick Chemical Company, founded by Lunsford Richardson in 1898.  Vicks today is best known for its VapoRub, DayQuil, and NyQuil brands, and it was once home to Icy Hot and Oil of Olay as well.  In 1948, after 32 years with the company in sales and advertising, Mabry was named President.  In 1957 he also became chairman of the board of directors.  Vicks became Richardson Merrell Inc. after merging with Marion Merrell Dow, and in 1985 was sold to Procter & Gamble, where it remains as a brand and product division.

Mabry the writer

In addition to his achievements in the business world, Mabry wrote eighteen books, among them collections of poetry and sayings.  His first book, Maybryana, was a cinquain-centric book of poetry.  It was followed the next year by Maybryettes, a sequel.  Further titles included Elm Leaves, Elm Leaves Keep Falling, Sail On! and The Velvet Touch.  All 18 were published in the United States by Pond-Ekberg.

References
Obituary, The New York Times February 5, 1989.
To Amend the Atomic Energy Act of 1946 : US Government Printing Office 1954
Dyer, Davis - Rising Tide : Lessons from 165 Years of Brand Building at Procter & Gamble, Harvard Business School Press 2004, 
Mabry, Edward L. - Maybryana, Pond-Ekberg 1977, LCCN 917800
Richardson, H. Smith - The Early History and Management Philosophy of Richardson-Merrell, 1975
Swasy, Alecia - Soap Opera: The Inside Story of Procter & Gamble, Times Books 1993,

External links
Pond-Ekberg
Procter and Gamble history page
New York Times obituary article

1989 deaths
1897 births
American male poets
20th-century American poets
20th-century American male writers